The word hooper is an archaic English term for a person who aided a cooper in the building of barrels by creating the hoop for the barrel. Hooper may also refer to:

Place names in the United States:
 Hooper, Colorado, town in Alamosa County, Colorado
 Hooper, Georgia, an unincorporated community
 Hooper, Nebraska, town in Dodge County, Nebraska
 Hooper, Utah, place in Weber County, Utah
 Hooper Bay, Alaska, town in Alaska
 Hooper Township, Dodge County, Nebraska

Other:
 Hooper (film), 1978 comedy film starring Burt Reynolds
 Hooper (mascot), the mascot for the National Basketball Association team, Detroit Pistons
 Hooper (coachbuilder), a British coachbuilder fitting bodies to many Rolls-Royce and Daimler cars
 USS Hooper (DE-1026), a destroyer escort in the US Navy
 Hooper Ratings, an early audience measurement in early radio and television
 Hooper, someone who practices dance form of Hooping

People with the surname Hooper:
 Hooper (surname)

See also 
 Hooper, an animated mascot for PBS Kids Television
 Hooper X, a character in Kevin Smith's 1997 film Chasing Amy
 Hoppity Hooper, American animated television series in the 1960s
 Hooper's Store, store on the children's TV show Sesame Street
 Cooper (surname)
 Justice Hooper (disambiguation)